The following is a list of people who have served as United States Ambassador to the Organization of American States, or the full title, "United States Permanent Representative to the Organization of American States", with the rank and status of Ambassador Extraordinary and Plenipotentiary.

References

External links
 United States Mission to the Organization of American States

United States–North American relations
United States–Central American relations
United States–South American relations
United States–Caribbean relations
United States
Organization of American States